Evolvulus glomeratus, commonly known as blue daze, Brazilian dwarf morning-glory, or Hawaiian blue eyes, is flowering plant from the family Convolvulaceae that is native to Brazil, Guyana, Bolivia and Venezuela.

Description
It is an evergreen subshrub that spreads to 60-90 cm in diameter with stems that become woody as they mature. Both leaves and stems have a light grey fuzz. 

The lavender-coloured flowers, with blueish petals, are funnel-shaped and are borne in leaf axils proximate to the stem tips. The flowers open in the morning and close by the evening. The plant flowers from summer to fall.

Subspecies
The species is divided into three subspecies: 

 Evolvulus glomeratus subsp. glomeratus Nees & Mart.
 Evolvulus glomeratus subsp. grandiflorus (Parodi) Ooststr.
 Evolvulus glomeratus subsp. obtusus (Meisn.) Ooststr.

Gallery

References

glomeratus
Medicinal plants of South America
Flora of Brazil
Flora of Guyana
Flora of Bolivia
Flora of Venezuela
Garden plants of South America